Japanese Girls at the Harbor is a collaborative studio album between Roberto Paci Dalò and Yasuhiro Morinaga produced at Concrete Studio in Tokyo. It is the sonorization for the Japanese silent film Japanese Girls at the Harbor  directed by Hiroshi Shimizu in 1933. Some of the sounds used for the project are recorded in the original shooting location at the port of Yokohama.

Background
The album is the first work of a project named after expression Soundograph, works to explore and create relations between silent cinema and sonic research.

Reception
According to Concrete, "Morinaga and Paci Dalo’s new soundtrack for the film creates alternative narrative structures through a complex layering of noise, voices, drones, environmental, instrumental, and electronic sounds."

Track listing

Personnel
 Composed, performed, and produced by Yasuhiro Morinaga and Roberto Paci Dalo
 Field Recording by Yasuhiro Morinaga + Naoki Kato
 Design by Roberto Paci Dalo and Eriko Sonoda
 Feedback Drone: Naoki Kato 
 Project Manager: Azusa Yamazaki

References

2012 albums
Albums by Italian artists
Albums by Japanese artists